This is a list of some notable alumni of Kwame Nkrumah University of Science and Technology.

Academics
 Pamela Mbabazi
 John Owusu Gyapong
 Kwesi Akwansah Andam
 Esi Awuah
 Richard Tuyee Awuah
 Ernest Aryeetey
 William Otoo Ellis
 Eric Aboagye
 Jacob Plange-Rhule
 Peter Twumasi, currently a professor

Arts
 Bright Tetteh Ackwerh
 Cephas Yao Agbemenu
 El Anatsui
 George O. Hughes
 Ablade Glover
 Atta Kwami
 Ibrahim Mahama
 Constance Swaniker

Diplomats 

Kofi Annan - former UN Secretary General
Kwaku Aning -former Deputy Director of IAEA
Emmanuel Bombande
Kwame Bawuah-Edusei

Engineering

Thomas Mensah
Benjamin Asante
Alex Mould
Clifford Braimah
Selorm Adadevoh - Chief Executive Officer of MTN Ghana, a subsidiary of MTN Group

Entertainment 

John Dumelo
Chris Attoh
Deborah Owusu-Bonsu
Nikoletta Samonas
Claudia Lumor

Journalism 

David Anaglate
Francisca Ashietey-Odunton
Ameyaw Debrah
Kwabena Sarpong-Anane

Music

DJ Aroma
Nii Okai
Mr Eazi
Teephlow
KODA
Okyeame Kwame
Alfred P. Addaquay
Blakk Rasta

Politics

 Aliu Mahama
 Edward Kwame Wiredu
 Albert Abongo
 Nana Konadu Agyeman Rawlings
 Hackman Owusu-Agyeman
 Felix Owusu-Adjapong
 Paul Victor Obeng
 Yaw Osafo-Marfo
 Joseph Yieleh Chireh
 Kwabena Agyapong
 Nayon Bilijo
 Patricia Appiagyei
 Matthew Opoku Prempeh
 Francisca Oteng-Mensah
 Zita Okaikoi
 Kwaku Kwarteng
 Dan Botwe
 Samuel Abu Jinapor
 Joseph Anokye
 Della Sowah
 Joseph Amenowode
 Kofi Dzamesi
 Joe Oteng-Adjei
 Richard W. Anane
 Emmanuel Armah Kofi Buah
 Nii Armah Ashitey
 Kwabena Twum-Nuamah
 Gifty Oware-Aboagye
 Alex Tettey-Enyo
 Mubarak Mohammed Muntaka
 Samira Bawumia
 Moses Asaga
 Emmanuel Kyeremateng Agyarko
 Kwame Awuah-Darko

Religion
 Samuel Koranteng-Pipim
 Francis Amenu

Royalty
 Nana Otuo Siriboe II

Military
 George Boakye

Public Service
 Georgina Opoku Amankwah
 Alex Dodoo

Sports
Daniel Sam (badminton)

References

Lists of Ghanaian people by school affiliation